Lucassen is a Dutch surname. Notable people with the surname include:

 Arjen Anthony Lucassen (born 1960), Dutch singer, songwriter, multi-instrumentalist musician, and record producer
 Eric Lucassen (born 1974), Dutch politician and digital music educator
 Ilona Lucassen (1997-2020), Dutch judoka 
 Rüdiger Lucassen (born 1951), German politician
 Sjaak Lucassen (born 1961), Dutch long-distance motorcycle rider

Dutch-language surnames
Patronymic surnames
Surnames from given names